Kamenskoye is a rural locality (a selo) and the administrative center of Penzhinsky District of Koryak Okrug of Kamchatka Krai, Russia, located on the bank of the river Penzhina. Population:

Climate
Kamenskoye has a subarctic climate (Köppen climate classification Dfc) with severely cold winters – although not nearly so extreme as the winters of the Yana and Indigirka basins – and mild summers. Precipitation is moderate and is heaviest in August and lightest in May.

References

Rural localities in Kamchatka Krai